The  ("Gathering Clouds") were a class of six torpedo boat destroyers (TBDs) of the Imperial Japanese Navy, built in Britain in 1897–99. The class is also sometimes referred to as the ("Daybreak"). All were named after celestial phenomena.

Background
In the First Sino-Japanese War, the Japanese navy came to understand the combat effectiveness of small, fast torpedo equipped warships over larger, slower ships equipped with slow-loading and often inaccurate naval artillery. Four ships were ordered under the 1896 fiscal year budget (Murakumo and Shinonome on 15 January 1897, and  Yūgiri and Shiranui on 7 May), and an additional two under the 1897 budget (Kagerō and Usugumo on 6 May 1898). All were ordered from John I. Thornycroft & Company in Chiswick, England. The last two were slightly (7½ tons) heavier than the first four, and thus had 1½ inches greater draught.

Design
The design of the Murakumo-class destroyers was based on Thorneycroft's two-stack destroyers for the Royal Navy (from 1913 known as the ) also known as the "Thirty Knotters". In particular, they were built to the same plans as Thornycroft's Coquette, Cygnet and Cynthia, to which they were sisterships. Although slightly smaller than the Ikazuchi class, they had the same armaments.

All Murakumo-class vessels had a flush deck design with a distinctive "turtleback" forecastle that was intended to clear water from the bow during high speed navigation, but was poorly designed for high waves or bad weather. The bridge and forward gun platform were barely raised above the bow, resulting in a wet conning position. More than half of the small hull was occupied by the boilers and the engine room. With fuel and weaponry, there was little space left for crew quarters.

Armament was one QF 12-pounder gun on a bandstand on the forecastle, five QF 6 pounder Hotchkiss guns (two sited abreast the conning tower, two sited between the funnels and one on the quarterdeck) and 2 single tubes for  torpedoes.

Operational history
All six Murakumo-class destroyers arrived in Japan in time to be used during the Russo-Japanese War of 1904–1905. All were present at the Battle of the Yellow Sea and the final crucial Battle of Tsushima.

The Murakumo-class vessels reclassified as third-class destroyers on 28 August 1912, and were removed from front-line combat service. Usugumo was wrecked in a typhoon in July 1913, but was salved and restored to service; Shinonome was lost when she broke in two during a typhoon off Taiwan on 23 July 1913 and not recovered.

The five surviving vessels were again used in combat with the start of World War I, during the Battle of Tsingtao and in the operations to seize German colonial possessions in the South Pacific.

After the war, Murakumo and Yūgiri were demilitarized, and used as depot ships in 1919–20, and then as auxiliary minesweepers in 1920. Shiranui and Kagerō served as tenders to the torpedo school in 1918, and were for disposal at Kure in April 1922 (broken up in 1923). Usugumo was similarly struck from the Navy List in 1922, and was broken up in 1927.

List of ships

Notes

References

External links

Destroyer classes
 
Russo-Japanese War naval ships of Japan
World War I destroyers of Japan
Ships built in Chiswick